Tannehill is an unincorporated community in Winn Parish, Louisiana, United States.

Notes

Unincorporated communities in Winn Parish, Louisiana
Unincorporated communities in Louisiana
Populated places in Ark-La-Tex